Grunion are two fish species of the genus Leuresthes: the California grunion, L. tenuis, and the Gulf grunion, L. sardinas. They are sardine-sized teleost fishes of the New World silverside family Atherinopsidae, found only off the coast of California, USA, and Baja California, Mexico, where the species are found on both the Pacific Ocean and Gulf of California coasts. Many people enjoy catching grunion at events called "grunion runs."

Grunion are known for their unusual mating ritual wherein at very high tides, the females come up on to sandy beaches where they dig their tails into the sand to lay their eggs. The male then wraps himself around the female to deposit his sperm, and for the next 10 days the grunion eggs remain hidden in the sand. At the next set of high tides, the eggs hatch and the young grunion are washed out to sea.

A related species, the false grunion (Colpichthys regis) lives in the Gulf of California. Although the fish looks and acts similarly, it does not have the same breeding method.

Species
The currently recognized species in this genus are:
 Leuresthes sardina (O. P. Jenkins & Evermann, 1889) (Gulf grunion)
 Leuresthes tenuis (Ayres, 1860) (California grunion)

Taxonomy
Grunion were originally classified as part of the Old World silverside family, Atherinidae, but are now classified in the family Atherinopsidae along with other New World silversides including the jacksmelt and topsmelt.

Distribution
The California grunion, L. tenuis, is found along the Pacific Coast from Point Conception, California, to Punta Abreojos, Baja California Sur. They are rarely found between San Francisco in the north and San Juanico Bay, Baja California Sur, in the south. The Gulf grunion, L. sardina, is found along the coast of Baja California in the Gulf of California.

Appearance and growth
They are small, slender fish with bluish-green backs and silvery sides and bellies. Their snouts are bluntly rounded and slippery. Silversides differ from true smelts of the family Osmeridae in that they lack the trout-like adipose fin.

Young grunion grow rapidly and are about five inches long by the time they reach one year old and are ready to spawn.

The normal lifespan of the grunion is three to four years, although individuals up to five years old have been found. Their growth rate slows after the first spawning and stops completely during the spawning season. Consequently, adult fish grow only during the fall and winter. This growth rate variation causes annuli to form on the scales, which have been used for determining ages.

Breeding

California grunion spawn on beaches from two to six nights after the full and new moon beginning soon after high tide and continuing for several hours. As a wave breaks on the beach, the grunion swim as far up the slope as possible. The female arches her body while keeping her head up and excavates the semifluid sand with her tail. As her tail sinks, the female twists her body and digs tail first until she is buried up to her pectoral fins. After the female is in the nest, up to eight males attempt to mate with her by curving around the female and releasing their milt as she deposits her eggs about four inches below the surface. After spawning, the males immediately retreat toward the ocean. The milt flows down the female’s body until it reaches the eggs and fertilizes them. The female twists free and returns to the sea with the next wave. The whole event can happen in 30 seconds, but some fish remain on the beach for several minutes. Spawning may continue from March through August, with occasional extensions into February and September. However, peak spawning is from late March through early June. Once mature, an individual may spawn during successive spawning periods at about 15-day intervals. Most females spawn about six times during the season. Counts of maturing ova to be laid at one spawning ranged from about 1,600 to about 3,600, with the larger females producing more eggs. A female might lay as many as 18,000 eggs over an entire season. The milt from the male might contain as many as one million sperm. Males may participate in several spawnings per run.

The eggs incubate a few inches deep in the sand above the level of subsequent waves. They are not immersed in seawater, but are kept moist by the residual water in the sand. While incubating, they are subject to predation by shore birds and sand-dwelling invertebrates. Under normal conditions, they do not have an opportunity to hatch until the next tide series high enough reaches them 10 or more days later. Grunion eggs can extend incubation and delay hatching if tides do not reach them for an additional four weeks after this initial hatching time. Most of the eggs will hatch in 10 days if provided with seawater and the agitation of the rising surf. The mechanical action of the waves is the environmental trigger for hatching. The rapidity of hatching, which occurs in less than one minute, indicates it is probably not an enzymatic function of a softening of the chorion as in some other fishes.

The Gulf grunion, with its smaller eggs, is unique in that it spawns during both night and daytime.

Although some other fish species leave their eggs in locations that dry out (a few, such as plainfin midshipman, may even remain on land with the eggs during low tide) or on plants above the water (splash tetras), jumping onto land en masse to spawn is unique to the grunion, capelin and grass puffer.

Feeding
Grunion feeding habits are not well known. They have no teeth and feed on very small organisms such as plankton. In a laboratory setting, grunion eat live brine shrimp.

Threats
The reduction of spawning habitat due to beach erosion, harbor construction, and pollution is believed to be the most critical problem facing the grunion species. An isopod, two species of flies, sandworms, and a beetle have been found preying on the eggs. Some shorebirds such as egrets and herons prey on grunion when the fish are on shore during spawning. Seagulls, sea lions, and larger fish such as sand sharks have also been observed feeding on grunion during a grunion run. The reduction of spawning habitat due to beach erosion, harbor construction, and pollution is believed to be the most critical problem facing the grunion species.

Status of population
Despite local concentrations, the grunion is not an abundant species. While the population size is not known, all research points to a restricted resource that is adequately maintained at current harvest rates under existing regulations.

Fishing

In the 1920s, recreational fishing of grunion caused definite signs of depletion resulting in a regulation passed in 1927 that established a closed season of three months from April until June. Grunion stocks improved and in 1947 the closed season was shortened to the months of April and May.  This closure is still in effect to protect grunion during their peak spawning period.

The periodic appearance of the grunion on Southern California beaches, and the act of catching them, is locally known as a "grunion run".  A fishing license is required for persons 16 years and older to catch grunion, and they may be taken by sport fishermen using their hands only. No appliances of any kind may be used to catch grunion, and no holes may be dug in the beach to entrap them. Grunion may be taken on specified dates between March and the end of August, but not during the months of April and May.  There is no limit, but fishermen may take only what they can use, as under Californian law it is unlawful to waste fish. With these regulations, the resource seems to be maintaining itself at a fairly constant level.

History

The coastal Native Americans in California harvested grunion during spawning runs. Archeologists have found fossil grunion otoliths (tiny, bonelike particles or stony platelike structures in the internal ear of lower vertebrates) at various Native American campsites.

Grunion were mentioned by Spanish explorer Juan Rodríguez Cabrillo in his ship's log dated around 1542.

Scientists first identified grunion in San Francisco Bay in 1860.

References

Further reading

External links
 grunion.org
 The Amazing Grunion  (California Dept. of Fish & Game)
 Grunion Greeters (volunteer observers)
 The Cabrillo Museum Grunion Programs in San Pedro, California
 Does Beach Grooming Harm Grunion Eggs?
 Fishbase Leuresthes tenuis (Ayres 1860) California grunion
 Fishbase Leuresthes sardina (Jenkins & Evermann 1889) Gulf grunion
 Fishbase Colpichthys  regis  (Jenkins & Evermann, 1889) False grunion
 Decoding the Grunion's Ways - LA Times article

Atherinopsidae

Extant Pleistocene first appearances
Taxa named by David Starr Jordan